City Center Mall was a shopping mall located in downtown Grand Forks, North Dakota that was constructed by closing off a block of Third Street. Construction was done in 1978 by building a roof over the former street and walls, closing off the block. Fountains were built where the street was located.

Despite the mall's attempt to attract shoppers to the downtown area, it did not improve business. This trend continued until the mall was destroyed in the flood of 1997. The mall was not rebuilt and Third Street was reopened to traffic.

External links

City Center Mall after 1997 flood by Alan Draves

Shopping malls in North Dakota
Buildings and structures in Grand Forks, North Dakota
Demolished shopping malls in the United States
Shopping malls established in 1978